The Editta Braun Company is a dance company founded in Salzburg, Austria in 1989 by the Austrian choreographer, dancer and dance instructor Editta Braun. Members of the multi-national team include dancers, composers, dramatic advisors and light designers. The Editta Braun Company’s work pursues political themes, including intercultural communication and feminist questions.  The company is particularly known for the body theatre performance pieces Lufus,  Luvos, vol. 2, planet LUVOS, Close Up, Close Up 2.0 and Fanghoumé.  The Editta Braun Company has toured in Europe, Asia, Africa and performs at both large and specialty festivals.

History 

Editta Braun was one of a group of students who formed the dance collective Vorgänge in 1982. She founded her own company shortly before the group broke up in 1989. In 1997, French composer and musician Thierry Zaboitzeff began creating sound tracks to accompany the group's productions;  most have been released as albums. Thomas Hinterberger and Peter Thalhamer have designed the lighting for many pieces.

The company collaborated with Egyptian director Mahmoud Aboudoma and his drama ensemble to create Coppercity 2001, based on one of the tales from 1001 Nights.

In 2002, the company began to incorporate texts into their productions, for example, Manfred Wöhlcke’s sociological essay Soziale Entropie and literary variations of the Arthur myth. In 2004, Austrian author Barbara Neuwirth wrote the text for Eurydike, a piece which was commissioned for the Brucknerfest in Linz, and included a chamber orchestra, drama and dance ensemble.   
 
In 2004, the company increased its staff of artistic directors and choreographers to include Arturas Valudskis, Rebecca Murgi, Shlomo Bitton, Teresa Ranieri, Mahmoud Aboudoma, Robert Pienz and Iris Heitzinger.

Over the years, outstanding artists from various disciplines (besides dance: drama, composition, direction, writing, dramaturgy, video, light design) have contributed their creative potential to the company. In the beginning, the company’s dance style was especially influenced by Céline Guillaume and Georg Blaschke, the work together with dance legend Jean Babilée, for whom Jean Cocteau and Roland Petit created Le jeune homme et la mort, was particularly sensational, immensely furthering the company’s international acclaim. Composer Peter Valentin contributed his work during this time.

For ten years, dancer Barbara Motschiunik played a main role in each production; in 2006, Anna Maria Müller and Tomaz Simatovic joined the group, together with Juan Dante Murillo Bobadilla.

Since 2010, several younger performers have joined the company, including Iris Heitzinger, Martyna Lorenc, Jerca Roznik Novak and others. Many performances have been developed with dramatist Gerda Poschmann-Reichenau.

The Luvos series 

Luvos is a series of body theater performances. The series premiered in 1985 as Kollektiv Vorgänge’s Lufus.

Between 2001 and 2012, Luvos, vol.2 was performed worldwide before audiences totalling about 15,000 people, in Jerusalem and Tel Aviv, Thessaloniki, Novosibirsk and Moscow, Marseille, Limassol and Nicosia, Brussels, Tallinn, Kaunas, Riga, Vienna, Salzburg and Linz.  In 2012, the piece was performed at the Manipulate Visual Theatre Festival in Edinburgh

planet LUVOS was performed in 2012 during the Brucknerfest in Linz and at Manipulate in 2014.

Close Up was performed at Manipulate in 2016.

The Editta Braun Company has mounted more than 100 performances of Luvos, and has been reviewed positively among others in Neue Westfälische, Neue Kronenzeitung, and TV Bomb

Publication 

In 2009, to commemorate the 20th anniversary of the founding of the Editta Braun Company, the volume Tanz Kunst Leben. 20 Jahre Editta Braun Company, edited by Gerda Poschmann-Reichenau and designed by Bettina Frenzel, was published. It contains reminiscences from people who have accompanied the company on its journey, descriptions and pictures from the dance-theater productions presented in the past 20 years in chronological order, as well as interviews with founder Editta Braun and participating artists.

Selected full-length productions 

 1989: Die Jagd – dance quintet
 1990: Materialien für Tanz & Musik - dance and live music
 1991: Collision - duet
 1992: but kind old sun will know ... – dance theater
 1993: La Vie, c’est contagieux - dance theater
Collision – dance short film
 1994: Voyage à Napoli - dance & rock’n roll live
 La Vie, c’est contagieux – video documentation about the creative process involved in making the stage piece
 1995: Titania – search image in movement about Sisi, Empress of Austria, Queen of Hungary
 1996: Im Dschungel des Pianisten – dance fable for young souls
 1997: Heartbeat – concerto for dance & music, op. 1 - duo music and dance
 1998: India
 1999: Miniaturen - dance and live music
 2000: Nebensonnen - quartet
 2001: Luvos, vol. 2 – body illusion theater
 2002: manifest - drama, martial arts, dance
Editta Braun Company in Dakar – video documentation about the creative process involved in making the stage piece manifest
 2003: Tajine – improvisational project with dance, drama, live music
 2004: Eurydike - symbiosis of three genres of the play ‚Eurydike’ from Barbara Neuwirth
 2005: oXalis
 2006: Matches of Time – dance theater
 2007: Coppercity 1001 - dance and drama
 e.poration – short film
 2008: Wenn ich einmal tot bin, komme ich ins Paradies - dance and song.
 2009: Abseits
 2010: König Artus
 2011: schluss mit kunst
 2012: planet LUVOS
 2013: currently resident in
2014: Paula
2015: close up
2016: LoSt
2017: Close Up 2.0
2018: trails 
2019: Fanghoumé
Layaz

Awards 

 1986: Second Prize and Award for Most Innovative Choreography at the Concours Chorégraphique International de Bagnolet in Paris for Lufus for the Kollektiv Vorgänge
 1995: bronze medal at the New York Film Festival for Collision, director Othmar Schmiderer
 2001: Award for Best Direction at the Cairo International Festival for Experimental Theatre for Nebensonnen
 2014: Internationaler Preis für Kunst und Kultur der Stadt Salzburg
2017: Großer Kunstpreis des Landes Salzburg

References 

Bibliographic Guide to Dance, Volumes 1-3

External links 

 Web presence Editta braun company - German
 Web presence Editta braun company - English
 Kulturfonds der Stadt Salzburg, Preisträgerinnen 2014 - German

Dance companies